Bálint Noé (born 5 October 1993) is a Hungarian sprint canoeist.

He competed at the 2021 ICF Canoe Sprint World Championships, winning a gold medal in the K-1 5000 m distance.

References

External links

1993 births
Living people
Hungarian male canoeists
ICF Canoe Sprint World Championships medalists in kayak
21st-century Hungarian people